The pterygoid is a paired bone forming part of the palate of many vertebrates, behind the palatine bones.

It is a flat and thin lamina, united to the medial side of the pterygoid process of the sphenoid bone, and to the perpendicular lamina of the palatine bone.

Bones of the head and neck